Robert Trznadel (born January 15, 1990 in Ruda Śląska) is a Polish footballer who plays for Stal Rzeszów.

Biography
Trznadel started his career at Górnik Zabrze and in January 2007 signed with Siena at age of 17, above the minimum age of international transfer within European Union. At the start of the 2007-08 season, he was signed by Parma and played there for one season. He then returned to Poland and made his senior debut in 2009–10 season in I liga.

References

External links
 
 Robert Trznadel at 90minut

Polish footballers
Polish expatriate footballers
Poland youth international footballers
Górnik Zabrze players
A.C.N. Siena 1904 players
Parma Calcio 1913 players
Okocimski KS Brzesko players
Polonia Bytom players
Odra Opole players
Stal Rzeszów players
II liga players
I liga players
Association football defenders
Expatriate footballers in Italy
1990 births
Living people
Sportspeople from Ruda Śląska